Aaron Farrugia (born 1 January 1980) is a Maltese Partit Laburista (Labour Party) politician and the current Minister for Transport, Infrastructure and Capital Projects. He previously served as Minister for the Environment, Climate Change & Planning in Prime Minister Robert Abela’s cabinet and served as Parliamentary Secretary for European Funds and Social Dialogue in former Prime Minister Joseph Muscat’s cabinet between 2017 and 2020.

He was elected as a member of the Parliament in June 2017 and was re-elected for a second consecutive time in the 2022 General Election. He is a member of the Cabinet of the Government of Malta and former Head of the Maltese Delegation in the Parliamentary Assembly for the Mediterranean. Farrugia also served as a member for the Foreign Affairs committee in Parliament during the thirteenth legislature.

An economist, Farrugia worked as an Advisor to the Maltese Delegation in the Committee of the Regions and later on as the Chief Executive Officer (CEO) of the Malta Freeport Corporation

Farrugia served in a number of positions in the Labour Party, mainly as an elected member of the Administrative Council and National Executive Committee of the Malta Labour Party and founder of the Labour Party think-tank Fondazzjoni IDEAT.

Biography

Studies and personal life

Farrugia obtained a B.A. with Honours in Finance at the University of Malta in 2002 and a M.A. in European Politics, Economics and Law at the same university in 2005. He then read for a Doctorate of Laws degree and graduated in 2017 with a doctoral thesis on direct democracy.

Aaron Farrugia is a visiting lecturer at the Faculty of Economics, Management and Accountancy of the University of Malta. He teaches Politics, Political Campaigning, Policies and Governance.

Aaron Farrugia is married and has two daughters, Petra, born in 2012 and Angelica, born in 2018.

Political career 

During his student days Farrugia was a member and Secretary General of  Pulse, a social democrat student organisation from 1998 to 2002, and later Financial Secretary of the Maltese National Youth Council between 2004 and 2005.

Farrugia then joined the Labour Party and served as Vice President (2000-2001) and then as President of the Labour Youth Forum (Forum Żgħazagħ Laburisti) between 2002–2004 and 2006–2008.

In 2005 Farrugia was elected as deputy mayor of the Ta’ Xbiex Local Council. 
Farrugia assisted Joseph Muscat's Labour Party leadership bid in 2008. He was then elected as education secretary in the new Labour Party executive, and coordinated the compilation of the 2013 party manifesto, besides founding and chairing the party think tank, Fondazzjoni Ideat, between 2009 and 2011.

Farrugia was elected for the first time as a Member of the Maltese Parliament in the 2017 general election, which he contested on 1st District. During his first legislature as a member of Parliament, Farrugia served as Parliamentary Secretary for European Funds and Social Dialogue and as Minister for the Environment, Climate Change and Planning after a cabinet reshuffle in January 2020. Farrugia was elected for a second consecutive time as a Member of Parliament and was entrusted with the Transport, Infrastructure and Capital Projects portfolio in Prime Minister Robert Abela's Cabinet.

Farrugia expressed support for a change towards a first past the post system, a separate list to increase the number of women in Parliament, and for higher salaries for Members of Parliament.

Memberships 
Farrugia is an Atlantic Forum Young Leader Alumnus (2011) and U.S. International Visitor Leadership Program's alumnus (2012); on the occasion, he spent four weeks with the 2012 Obama campaign. Farrugia is also a member of the Malta-United States Alumni Association (MUSAA). Friends of Europe listed him among the 40under40 European Young Leaders in 2017.

References

External links

1980 births
Living people
Maltese people of Jewish descent
Maltese Roman Catholics
Maltese economists
Labour Party (Malta) politicians
Government ministers of Malta
University of Malta alumni
21st-century Maltese politicians